The 2022–23 EIHL season is the 19th season of the Elite Ice Hockey League. The regular season commenced on 10 September 2022, and is planned to finish on 16 April 2023.

Teams
The same ten teams that competed in 2021–22 are competing in the 2022–23 season.

Regular season

League standings
Each team plays 54 games, playing each of the other nine teams six times: three times on home ice, and three times away from home. Points are awarded for each game, where two points are awarded for all victories, regardless of whether it was in regulation time or after overtime or game-winning shots. One point is awarded for losing in overtime or game-winning shots, and zero points for losing in regulation time. At the end of the regular season, the team that finishes with the most points is crowned the league champion. The top eight teams qualify for the playoffs.

Results

Statistics

Scoring leaders

The following players led the league in points, at the conclusion of matches played on 19 March 2023. If two or more skaters are tied (i.e. same number of points, goals and played games), all of the tied skaters are shown.

Leading goaltenders
The following goaltenders led the league in goals against average, provided that they have played at least 40% of their team's minutes, at the conclusion of matches played on 19 March 2023.

References

External links

Elite Ice Hockey League seasons
2022–23 in British ice hockey
United
EIHL